Fairburn is a city in Fulton County, Georgia, United States, with a population of 12,950, according to the 2010 census. Though it has a rich history of its own, the city is now a closely linked suburb of Atlanta, which lies just 17 miles to the north.

History 
Fairburn is located along a railroad line and was the county seat of Campbell County starting in 1871. It was chosen as county seat in a referendum in 1871 that was spurred by the original seat of Campbellton refusing to allow the Atlanta & West Point Railroad line through on account of the anticipated noise in the 1850s. The railroad instead passed through Fairburn. Campbellton then faded away as Fairburn grew. The government of Campbell County went bankrupt in 1931 during the Great Depression and, along with Milton County to the north, was absorbed into Fulton County when 1932 began.

The community is named after Fairburn, in England.

Geography
Fairburn is located at  (33.562411, -84.581443). Fairburn is located along Interstate 85, which leads northeast  to downtown Atlanta and southwest  to Montgomery, Alabama. Georgia State Route 74 also runs through the city, leading south  to Peachtree City. Some areas in nearby Fayette County have a Fairburn mailing address.

Demographics

2020 census

As of the 2020 United States census, there were 16,483 people, 5,051 households, and 3,442 families residing in the city.

2000 census
As of the census of 2000, there were 5,464 people, 1,879 households, and 1,416 families residing in the city. The racial makeup of the city was 47.64% African American, 43.08% White, 0.29% Native American, 0.71% Asian, 6.46% from other races, and 1.81% from two or more races. Hispanic or Latino of any race were 13.01% of the population.

There were 1,879 households, out of which 37.1% had children under the age of 18 living with them, 51.0% were married couples living together, 18.4% had a female householder with no husband present, and 24.6% were non-families. 19.7% of all households were made up of individuals, and 7.0% had someone living alone who was 65 years of age or older. The average household size was 2.85 and the average family size was 3.26.

In the city, the population was spread out, with 27.3% under the age of 18, 10.1% from 18 to 24, 30.7% from 25 to 44, 20.6% from 45 to 64, and 11.5% who were 65 years of age or older. The median age was 33 years. For every 100 females, there were 94.8 males. For every 100 females age 18 and over, there were 92.0 males.

The median income for a household in the city was $39,679, and the median income for a family was $42,219. Males had a median income of $32,708 versus $28,940 for females. The per capita income for the city was $18,898. About 6.1% of families and 7.7% of the population were below the poverty line, including 11.9% of those under age 18 and 2.8% of those age 65 or over.

Education
 Fulton County Schools serves Fairburn.
 Arlington Christian School is a private school in Fairburn.
 Atlanta-Fulton Public Library System operates the Fairburn Branch.
 Landmark Christian School is a private school in Fairburn.
 Georgia Military College has a campus located in Fairburn, offering associate degrees.
 Brenau University has a satellite campus in Fairburn.
University of Georgia at Fairburn is located in Fairburn.

Culture
Fairburn is home to the Georgia Renaissance Festival, in operation during the springtime.
The City of Fairburn hosts the "Fairburn Festival" each fall, featuring a parade, local food and crafts vendors and musical performances.

In popular culture
Fairburn was referenced in the 1970 song "Good Friends and Neighbors" by country singer Jerry Reed, a Georgia native. The song follows the story of a circuit judge from Monroe, Georgia who has been robbed by a hitchhiker he picked up in Fairburn and then continues to have trouble solving his situation in town, before walking into a local restaurant and telling his story to the friendly staff.

References

Cities in Georgia (U.S. state)
Cities in Fulton County, Georgia
Fairburn
Populated places established in 1870
Former county seats in Georgia (U.S. state)
1870 establishments in Georgia (U.S. state)